The Philippi Stadium is located in Cape Town, Western Cape, South Africa and is used for soccer matches. The Phillipi Stadium precinct was developed as a practice venue and fan park for the 2010 FIFA World Cup.

The cost is estimated at R90 million and will include retail and commercial components. The venue which currently seats 2,000 and includes an athletics and cycle track, will be replaced by the new 10,000 seat football stadium.

Vasco da Gama have moved some Premier Soccer League matches to the new stadium since its completion.

External links
 Stadium upgrade in Phillipi a boon
 Ebrahim Rasool speech
 Soccerway info about Phillipi stadium
Photos of Stadiums in South Africa at cafe.daum.net/stade

Sports venues in Cape Town
Soccer venues in South Africa